The CBOE S&P 500 BuyWrite Index (ticker symbol BXM) is a benchmark index designed to show the hypothetical performance of a portfolio that engages in a buy-write strategy using S&P 500 index call options.

Description

The term buy-write is used because the investor buys stocks and writes call options against the stock position. The writing of the call option provides extra income for an investor who is willing to forego some upside potential.

The BXM Index is designed to show the hypothetical performance of a strategy in which an investor buys a portfolio of the S&P 500 stocks, and also sells (or writes) covered call options on the S&P 500 Index.

History
Investors have used exchange-listed options to engage in buy-write strategies since the 1970s, but prior to 2002 there was no major benchmark for buy-write strategies.  To develop the CBOE S&P 500 BuyWrite Index (ticker BXM), the Chicago Board Options Exchange commissioned Professor Robert Whaley of Vanderbilt University.  In April 2002, the index was announced with the publication of Whaley's "Return and Risk of CBOE Buy-Write Monthly Index" in Journal of Derivatives (Winter 2002).

Investors have used covered call strategies for more than three decades. As noted in a magazine article “Buy Writing Makes Comeback as Way to Hedge Risk.” Pensions & Investments, (May 16, 2005), two developments have enhanced the interest in covered call strategies in recent years: (1) in 2002 the Chicago Board Options Exchange introduced the first major benchmark index for covered call strategies, the CBOE S&P 500 BuyWrite Index (ticker BXM), and (2) in 2004 the Ibbotson Associates consulting firm published a case study on buy-write strategies.  In 2006 Callan Associates published A Review of the CBOE S&P 500 BuyWrite Index.

The BXM Index won the Most Innovative Benchmark Index award at the 2004 Super Bowl of Indexing Conference.

Many active strategies employing volatility patterns as signals for more than 16 years have provided a systematic approach that employs behavioral investment theories based on "herding investor biases" and other psychological biases inherent in active trading strategies have been created since the discovery of the groundbreaking study was published initially in November 2005 by Lehman Brothers and subsequently validated, publicised and formed the foundation and innovation that ultimately resulted in the development an entirely new method of active investing and ultimately led to the creation of an entirely new actively-managed investment category offering investors an innovative, consistently profitable field with superior return-to-risk field in asset management attracting more than $50 billion invested in funds and ETFs as of 2016."

More than forty new buy-write investment products have been introduced since mid-2004 (see examples below).

See also
 CBOE S&P 500 PutWrite Index
 Chicago Board Options Exchange

References

Blake, R. "Investors Are Dusting Off an Old Strategy, Options Overlay; When It Works, It Offers Both Yield Enhancement and Risk Management." Institutional Investor, (Sept. 2002), pp. 173 – 174.
Callan Associates. A Review of the CBOE S&P 500 BuyWrite Index (BXM). (October 2006).
Crawford, Gregory. “Buy Writing Makes Comeback as Way to Hedge Risk.” Pensions & Investments, (May 16, 2005).
Demby, E. R. “Maintaining Speed -- In a Sideways or Falling Market, Writing Covered Call Options Is One Way To Give Your Clients Some Traction.”  Bloomberg Wealth Manager, (February 2005).
Feldman, Barry and Dhuv Roy. "Passive Options-Based Investment Strategies: The Case of the CBOE S&P 500 BuyWrite Index." The Journal of Investing, (Summer 2005).
Ferry, John.   "An Array of Options - A Buy-write Strategy Can Add Some Octane to Portfolios When the Markets Lack Direction." Worth Magazine,  (April 2005), pp. 102 – 104.
Hadi, Mohammed. "Buy-Write Strategy Could Help in Sideways Market." Wall Street Journal. (April 29, 2006) pg. B5.
Hill, Joanne, Venkatesh Balasubramanian, Krag (Buzz) Gregory, and Ingrid Tierens. "Finding Alpha via Covered Index Writing." Financial Analysts Journal. (Sept.-Oct. 2006). pp. 29–46.
Keenan, C.  “Mass Appeal   It's Still a Niche Market, But More Assets Are Flowing Into Mutual Funds That Use Hedge Fund Techniques.”  Institutional Investor,  ( July 2004).
Moran, Matthew.  “Risk-adjusted Performance for Derivatives-based Indexes – Tools to Help Stabilize Returns.” The Journal of Indexes. (Fourth Quarter, 2002) pp. 34 – 40.
Renicker, Ryan, Devapriya Mallick. "Enhanced Call Overwriting." Lehman Brothers Equity Derivatives Strategy. (Nov 17, 2005).
Roeder, David.  "New Funds Try Options to Boost Stock Income."  Chicago Sun-Times, (October 10, 2004).
Schneeweis, Thomas, and Richard Spurgin. "The Benefits of Index Option-Based Strategies for Institutional Portfolios" The Journal of Alternative Investments, (Spring 2001), pp. 44 – 52.
Smith, Steven. "Covered Calls Move Closer to the Masses" TheStreet.com (April 2003)
Smith, Steven.  “Options on Covered Calls.” RealMoney, (Dec. 20, 2006).
Tan, Kopin, "Yield Boost -- Firms Market Covered-call Writing to Up Returns."  Barron's, (Oct. 25, 2004).
Tergesen, Anne. "Taking Cover with Covered Calls." Business Week, (May 21, 2001), pp. 132.
Wasik, J.  “Used Wisely, Options Can Help Dodge Stock Losses.”  Bloomberg News, (May 15, 2005).
Whaley, Robert. "Risk and Return of the CBOE BuyWrite Monthly Index" The Journal of Derivatives, (Winter 2002), pp. 35 – 42.
Woolley, S. “Squeeze Your Portfolio Harder,” BusinessWeek, (December 27, 2004).

External links
Yahoo! Covered Calls
Covered Calls Worksheet

American stock market indices
S&P Global
Options (finance)